Rezky Ikhwan (born 21 June 1993) is an Indonesian professional footballer who plays as a midfielder for Liga 3 club Adhyaksa Farmel.

Club career

Persika Karawang
He was signed for Persika Karawang to play in Liga 2 in 2017 and 2018 season.

TIRA-Persikabo
In 2019, Rezky Ikhwan signed a year contract with TIRA-Persikabo from Persika Karawang. He made his league debut on 18 May 2019 in a match against Badak Lampung at the Pakansari Stadium, Cibinong.

Badak Lampung
In 2021, Rezky signed a contract with Indonesian Liga 2 club Badak Lampung. He made first 2021–22 Liga 2 debut on 19 October 2021, coming on as a starting in a 1–0 loss against RANS Cilegon at the Gelora Bung Karno Madya Stadium, Jakarta.

Career statistics

Club

References

External links
 Rezky Ikhwan at Soccerway
 Rezky Ikhwan at Liga Indonesia

1993 births
Living people
Indonesian footballers
Persikabo 1973 players
Association football defenders
Persikabo Bogor players
People from Bogor
Sportspeople from West Java